The square foot (plural square feet; abbreviated sq. ft, sf, or ft2; also denoted by '2) is an imperial unit and U.S. customary unit (non-SI, non-metric) of area, used mainly in the United States and partially in Canada, the United Kingdom, Bangladesh, India, Nepal, Pakistan, Ghana, Liberia, Malaysia, Myanmar, Singapore and Hong Kong. It is defined as the area of a square with sides of 1 foot.

Although the pluralization is regular in the noun form, when used as an adjective, the singular is preferred. So, an apartment measuring 700 square feet could be described as a 700 square-foot apartment. This corresponds to common linguistic usage of foot.

The square foot unit is commonly used in real estate. Dimensions are generally taken with a laser device, the latest in a long line of tools used to gauge the size of apartments or other spaces. Real estate agents often measure straight corner-to-corner, then deduct non-heated spaces, and add heated spaces whose footprints exceed the end-to-end measurement.

1 Square foot conversion to other units of area:

 1 square foot (ft²) = 0.000022956341 acres (ac)
 1 square foot (ft²) = 0.000009290304 hectare (ha)
 1 square foot (ft²) = 0.09290304 square meters (m²)
 1 square foot (ft²) = 144.0000002229 square inches (in²)
 1 square foot (ft²) = 0.111111106982 square yards (yd²)
 1 square foot (ft²) = 929.0304014422 square centimeters (cm²)
 1 square foot (ft²) = 9.290304 square decimeters (dm²)
 1 square foot (ft²) = 0.00000009290304 square kilometers (km²)
 1 square foot (ft²) = 144003673094580 square microinches (µin²)
 1 square foot (ft²) = 92903040000 square micrometers (μm²)
 1 square foot (ft²) = 0.0000000358701 square miles (mi²)
 1 square foot (ft²) = 92903.04 square millimeters (mm²)

See also 

 Area (geometry)
 Conversion of units
 Cubic foot
 Metrication in Canada
 Miscellaneous Technical (Unicode) for a list of miscellaneous technical symbols and fonts which support the square foot symbol
 Orders of magnitude (area)
 Square (algebra), square root

References

Units of area
Imperial units
Customary units of measurement in the United States